Four destroyers in the United States Navy comprised the Cassin class. All served as convoy escorts during World War I. The Cassins were the first of five "second-generation" 1000-ton four-stack destroyer classes that were front-line ships of the Navy until the 1930s. They were known as "thousand tonners" for their normal displacement, while the previous classes were nicknamed "flivvers" for their small size, after the Model T Ford.

They were the first to carry the new /50 caliber guns.

The  was built concurrently, and those four ships are often considered to be Cassins. Both classes were ordered in fiscal year 1912.

The class performed convoy escort missions in the Atlantic in World War I. Hulls 43–45 served in the United States Coast Guard as part of the Rum Patrol in 1924–31. All were scrapped 1934–35 to comply with the London Naval Treaty.

Design
The increase in normal displacement to over 1,000 tons was due to the desire to combine a heavy armament with a substantial cruising range. The engineering arrangement of two-shaft direct drive turbines was similar to some previous ships, but the poor performance of early cruising turbines caused a reversion to reciprocating engines for cruising. Hulls 43 and 44 had a triple expansion engine that could be clutched to one shaft for cruising; the other pair of ships had a similar arrangement on both shafts.

"Thousand tonner" development
The "thousand tonner" type included 26 destroyers in five classes: four Cassins, four Aylwins, six s, six s, and six s. The ships were commissioned 1913–17. As the type developed the gun armament of four 4 inch (102 mm) guns remained the same, torpedo armament greatly increased, and displacement rose by about 100 tons. The Cassin and Aylwin classes had eight 18-inch (450 mm) torpedo tubes in twin broadside mounts, two mounts on each side. The O'Briens introduced the  torpedo to the US destroyer force, but the number of tubes remained at eight. In the Sampsons, torpedo armament was increased to twelve 21 inch (533 mm) tubes by replacing the twin mounts with triple mounts. The subsequent "flush deck" types retained the gun and torpedo armament of the Sampsons on a new hull with displacement increased by about 100 tons, and with a new engineering plant. The thousand tonners also debuted US destroyer anti-aircraft armament: two 1-pounder (37 mm) autocannons were specified for the Tuckers but not fitted until the Sampsons.

In engineering, cruising turbines were re-introduced with the Tucker and Sampson classes.  had prototype fully geared turbines without cruising turbines; this arrangement was later adopted for the  "flush deckers"; other flush deckers had geared turbines with varying cruising arrangements.

Armament
The gun armament of four /50 caliber Mark 9 guns was a significant increase from the five  guns of the Paulding class, and remained the standard US destroyer gun armament through the "flush deck" Clemson-class destroyers commissioned through 1921. It reflected the increasing size of foreign destroyers that the Cassins might have to fight. The torpedo armament of eight 18-inch (450 mm) torpedo tubes was an increase of two tubes over the Pauldings.  A factor in the size of the torpedo armament was the General Board's decision to use broadside rather than centerline torpedo tubes. This was due to the desire to have some torpedoes remaining after firing a broadside, and problems experienced with centerline mounts on previous classes with torpedoes striking the gunwales of the firing ship.

The class was probably equipped with one or two depth charge racks each for anti-submarine convoy escort missions in World War I.

Engineering
Most references list the propulsion plant of Cassin and Cummings as standard for the class. However, the Navy's official Ships' Data Book for 1912 shows there was some variation. A small triple-expansion engine could be clutched to one shaft for economical cruising at moderate speeds. Early steam turbines were inefficient at low speed, and this was only remedied with the rise in steam pressure and the introduction of geared cruising turbines during World War I. Downes had Thornycroft boilers and Duncan had Yarrow boilers. Both of these had Curtis steam turbines and triple-expansion cruising engines on both shafts.

Normal fuel oil capacity was 312 tons.

Ships in class

See also

References

Bibliography

External links
Tin Can Sailors @ Destroyers.org - Cassin class destroyer
DestroyerHistory.org Cassin class destroyer
DestroyerHistory.org Thousand Tonner page
NavSource Destroyer Photo Index Page
DiGiulian, Tony Navweaps.com 4"/50 Mks 7, 8, 9, and 10
DiGiulian, Tony Navweaps.com Pre-WWII US Torpedoes
US Navy Torpedo History, part 2 

 
Destroyer classes